Banac is a surname. Notable people with the surname include:

Grozdana Banac (born 1951), Serbian politician
Ivo Banac (1947–2020), Croatian-American historian

See also
Banach
Banak (disambiguation)